Clackamette Park is a public park in Oregon City, in the U.S. state of Oregon. The park has a boat ramp, and served as a film location for Grimm.

References

External links

 Clackamette Park at the City of Oregon City

Oregon City, Oregon
Parks in Clackamas County, Oregon